Giuseppe Segusini (15 July 1801 - 29 March 1876) was an Italian neoclassical architect.

Biography
He was born in Feltre, one of twenty children to a poor family, and the only to survive to adulthood. As a child, he worked as a laborer.</ref> The local count Fedele Norcen took an interest in his education, and he entered the school of design directed by Agostino Occofer. By age 19, he had won an architecture prize from the Academy of Fine Arts of Venice, and enrolled the next year. In 1826, he left the academy and participated in various architectural projects in Feltre, Malamocco, and Venice, including a chapel for the Canon Bartolomeo Villabruna and restorations for the Duomo of Oderzo. In 1833, he was selected in 1833 to design and build the Theater of Belluno. In 1838, he obtained the title to work as architect or engineer.

Among his further projects were the church of Santa Maria Nascente in Agordo; the town hall and Palazzo Cappellari in Belluno; a tempietto in Mel; the theater of Serravalle; the church of San Lucano in Villapiccola; and an oratory in Busta. He also designed a theater for Innsbruck in Austria and the Mausoleum for the Tacchi family of Rovereto. He designed various altars and church interiors, including for the Baptistry of Feltre, for the church of Santa Maria Nascente at Pieve di Cadore, for the church of San Gervasio in Belluno, for the church of Santa Giustina in the parish of the same name, and for the parish church of Enego, for the Cathedral of Feltre, for the parish church of Mezzolombardo, and the parish church of Pozzale in Pieve di Cadore, completed by the sculptor Valentino Besarel. In 1855, he completed the stucco decorations for the church of Santi Pietro e Paolo in the neighborhood of Levada in Piombino Dese. He worked in the reconstruction of the apse of the Cathedral of Belluno, which had collapsed during the earthquake of 1873. He designed the access stairs to the Sanctuary of Santi Vittore e Corona. He worked in the reconstructions of the towns of Padola and Lorenzago, destroyed by fires respectively in 1846 and 1865.

Gallery

References

 Provincia Belluno

1801 births
1876 deaths
People from Feltre
19th-century Italian architects
Italian neoclassical architects